Gurinder Singh (born 2 March 1989), known as Gurinder is the current captain of India men's national volleyball team. He currently plays for Ahmedabad Defenders in Pro Volleyball League.

Early life 
Gurinder Singh was born on 2 March 1989 at Chandigarh, Punjab. Having noticed by SAI Coach Mohan Nargeta with a talent for volleyball, he started his national career in 2004. Because of his national level recognition, he was rewarded with a job in Punjab Police Department as Officer.
His instagram is shrutx3

References

Living people
Indian men's volleyball players
1989 births
Volleyball players at the 2010 Asian Games
Volleyball players at the 2014 Asian Games
Volleyball players at the 2018 Asian Games
Volleyball players from Chandigarh
Asian Games competitors for India